Daniel Peter Roche (born 14 October 1999) is an English actor, known for playing Ben Brockman in the BBC One sitcom Outnumbered.

Life
Roche was born on 14 October 1999 to an English mother and an Irish father. He grew up in north London, attending a state CofE primary school whilst also attending the Susi Earnshaw Theatre School in Barnet for extra-curricular drama lessons. At 12, he was granted a scholarship to the independent University College School in Camden, London. In September 2018, he enrolled as an undergraduate at King's College London, where he plays for the Rugby Football Club.

Career
For his appearances in Outnumbered as Ben, he was nominated for Best Male Newcomer at the 2009 British Comedy Awards. He also appeared in the BBC One show Casualty, the film Off Season (2008), and a number of television commercials, including one for Kingsmill.

Roche played the title role in a BBC adaptation of Just William (2010), which won a children's BAFTA for best drama. He also appeared in the Sky1 comedy series Little Crackers, as a young Stephen Fry on 20 December 2010.

Filmography

Awards

References

External links

1999 births
Living people
Male actors from London
People educated at University College School
English male child actors
English male television actors
21st-century English male actors
People educated at Susi Earnshaw Theatre School